Cisco is a given name, nickname, and surname. It may refer to:

People with the given name 

 Cisco Adler (born 1978), American rock musician
 Cisco McSorley (born 1950), American politician
 Cisco Everville

People with the nickname 

 Francisco Cisco Carlos (born 1940), retired Major League Baseball pitcher
 Gilbert Cisco Houston (1918–1961), American folk singer associated with Woody Guthrie
 Israel Cisco Oliver (born 1947), American retired Philippine Basketball Association player

People with the surname 

Andre Cisco (born 2000), American football player
Galen Cisco (born 1936), American baseball player
Jay Guy Cisco (1844-1922), American Confederate veteran, journalist, diplomat and businessman
Michael Cisco (born 1970), American writer

See also 

 
 
 Cisco (disambiguation)
 Sisko (disambiguation)

Lists of people by nickname